Euroland was a Dutch variety store chain.

History
In 1997, the first 2.50 Shop opened its doors, selling everything for ƒ2.50. In 2001, the similar shop called Knaakland ("knaak" was a ƒ2.50 coin) was bought by the 2.50 Shop chain. Both shops kept their original name until the introduction of the euro, less than a year later. Both shops were rebranded to Euroland, using a logo similar to that of Knaakland, and initially selling everything for a euro.

As the assortment expanded, the initial €1-only policy was dropped, and other, more expensive goods appeared. Later on however, everything displayed on the side walls was on sale for €1 with more expensive goods occupying the middle of the store. This partitioning was intended to avoid confusion.

The chain went bankrupt in 2017.

See also
 Action
 Zeeman (chain store)
 Poundland
 Family Dollar

References

Retail companies established in 1997
Variety stores